Carlos Vagner Gularte Filho (born 29 October 1990), known as Ferrão, is a Brazilian futsal player who plays for Barcelona and the Brazilian national futsal team as a pivot.

Honours
Primera División: 2018-19, 2020-21, 2021-22
Copa del Rey:
UEFA Futsal Champions League: Champion: 2019-2020, 2021-2022
Best Player in the World: 2019, 2020, 2021

References

External links
Liga Nacional Fútbol Sala profile

1990 births
Living people
Futsal forwards
Brazilian men's futsal players
FC Barcelona Futsal players